Water cascade analysis (WCA) is a technique to calculate the minimum flowrate target for feedwater and wastewater for continuous water-using processes.

Principle
It is a tabular and numerical alternative to the water surplus diagram in Water Pinch which can be used to identify opportunities for reduction in feedwater usage and the design of water distribution networks. The WCA is done in three steps, a global analysis of water distribution and consumption in the network, establishing baseline minimum water targets and redesign of the water network to achieve these targets.

History
WCA was first introduced by Manan, Tan and Foo in 2004. Since then, it has been widely used as a tool for water conservation in industrial process plants. A Time dependent water cascade analysis was presented later on. A variation of the WCA is the gas cascade analysis (GCA).

References

See also
Cost effective minimum water network
Water management hierarchy
Reclaimed water

Mechanical engineering
Chemical process engineering
Building engineering
Water resources management
Analysis